The E90 Expressway or Besham–Khwazakhela Expressway (Pashto/) is a proposed controlled-access expressway which will link the eastern town of Besham, Shangla District on the N-35 with the western town of Khwazakhela, Swat District on the N-90 in Khyber Pakhtunkhwa, Pakistan. This is not to be confused with the Swat Expressway, which is a provincial road project being constructed by the Pakhtunkhwa Highways Authority.

See also
 Expressways of Pakistan

References

External links
 National Highway Authority
 Pakistan National Highways & Motorway Police

90
90